Dibba Al-Hisn Sports Club is a sports club located in the city of Dibba Al-Hisn in the United Arab Emirates. The club was established in 1980. It currently competes in the UAE First Division League.

History 
The first team to be founded in Dibba Al-Hisn was Al-Fajr club in 1967 while Al-Dhafir club was founded during a training session in Kuwait. Around 1974, the two clubs agreed to merge as Al Hisn club in 1974. In 1980, the team officially registered into the UAE football league under the name of Dibba Al Hisn Sports Club. The team has mostly spent their time in UAE's 2nd tier football, only getting promoted once in 2005, the 2005–06 season remains the only time the club experienced top flight football.

List of club chairmans
{| class="wikitable"
|-
! Years
! Name
|-
| 1980–????
|  Rashid Saeed Hubainah
|-
| ????–????
|  Abdulla Ali Abdulla bin Yaroof
|-
| ????–????
|  Muhammad Ubaid al-Muhallabi
|-
| ????–????
|  Muhammad Abdullah Shukrallah
|-
| ????–????
|  Saeed Suleiman bin Zayed
|-
| ????–2009
|  Muhammad Abdulrahman Saleh
|-
| 2009–2017
|  Mohammed Ahmed bin Yarouf
|-
| 2017–2019
|  Khamis Ali Khasaw
|-
| 2019–Present
|  Ibrahim Baghdad Al Darmaki

Current squad 

As of UAE Division One:

References 

Dibba
Association football clubs established in 1980
1980 establishments in the United Arab Emirates
Sport in the Emirate of Sharjah
Organisations based in the Emirate of Sharjah